aka Sengoku Rock: Female Warriors and Warring States Rock: Gale-Force Women is a 1972 Japanese film in Nikkatsu's Roman porno series, directed by Yasuharu Hasebe and starring Mari Tanaka.

Synopsis
In Japan's Sengoku period, a group of beautiful women warriors are on a mission to deliver a sacred scroll to a distant lord. On the way, they help a small village in its fight against bandits.

Cast
 Mari Tanaka: Wan
 Keiko Tsuzuki: Shino
 Yuri Yamashina: Nene
 Shō Munakata: Yayoi
 Setsuko Ōyama: Sakura
 Sayori Shima: Suzume: Suzume
 Keiko Aikawa: Ume
 kenji kaji: Tarō Tenma
 Hyōe Enoki: Jizō Rokkaku
 Genjirō Arato: Nojirō Nitta
 Hiroshi Gojō: Saburō of Santo
 Machiyo Mako: 
 Genshū Hanayagi: Mother of Yayoi

Background
The screenplay to Naked Seven was written by the cult film director Atsushi Yamatoya, who had helped write the screenplay to Seijun Suzuki's cult classic Branded to Kill (1967). Yamatoya is best known for his own noir crime-thriller-cum pink film Inflatable Sex Doll of the Wastelands (1967). The plot of Naked Seven is an obvious take-off on Akira Kurosawa's Seven Samurai (1954), which it satirizes. American arthouse audiences could appreciate the parody of Kurosawa, but to Japanese audiences the film also served as a reference to director Yasuharu Hasebe's own popular Alleycat Rock series (1970–71) from the pre-Roman Porno era. This series featured actress Meiko Kaji in stories about a female motorcycle gang.

Having been a director at Nikkatsu since before the Roman Porno days, Hasebe was uncomfortable with the pink film genre, and mixed his first two Roman Pornos with other genres to create interest. Besides the historical-adventure style of Naked Seven, he departed from standard pink style with his next film, Sukeban Deka: Dirty Mary (1974), a tribute to the Dirty Harry films. Naked Seven was successful at the time of its release, and, in their Japanese Cinema Encyclopedia: The Sex Films (1998), the Weissers give the film three points out of four. Because Naked Seven and Dirty Mary, Hasebe's first two films in the Roman Porno series, had both departed from standard pink themes, Hasebe did not consider them to be Pink Films. After departing Nikkatsu for television, he returned to the studio to direct controversial rape-themed films in the "Violent Pink" genre. Hasebe considered the first of these films, Rape! (1976), to be his first true sex film. Through the "violent pink" genre, Hasebe had the creative freedom from the strict sex formula, and created such controversial films as Assault! Jack the Ripper (1976) and Rape! 13th Hour (1977). Though Hasebe's films in this genre are generally considered his best work, they remain controversial.

Naked Seven was a showcase for Nikkatsu's top starlets of the time. Mari Tanaka, as leader of the gang, had made news headlines through her association with the controversial and persecuted Love Hunter (1972) and its sequel, and was an idol of the anti-establishment. Genshū Hanayagi was a classical ballerina who came to Nikkatsu's attention through appearance in a television commercial. Her major role in director Noboru Tanaka's later Nikkatsu Roman Porno Secret Chronicles: She-Beast Market (1974) created news in Japan.

Availability
Naked Seven was released theatrically in Japan on December 27, 1972, and played in U.S. arthouse theaters in the 1970s. It was released on DVD in Japan on December 21, 2007, as part of Geneon's tenth wave of Nikkatsu Roman porno series.

Bibliography

English

Japanese

Notes

1972 films
Films directed by Yasuharu Hasebe
1970s Japanese-language films
Nikkatsu films
Nikkatsu Roman Porno
1970s Japanese films